Mae Raem is a tambon (subdistrict) of Mae Rim District, in Chiang Mai Province, Thailand. In 2005 it had a population of 8,264. The tambon contains 12 villages.

References

Tambon of Chiang Mai province
Populated places in Chiang Mai province